Patti Carr Black is an American non-fiction writer. She has authored many books about the history and culture of Mississippi.

Life
Black was born in Sumner, Mississippi. She graduated from the Mississippi University for Women in 1955 and she earned a master's degree from Emory University.

Black has authored many books about the history and culture of Mississippi. She is the recipient of the Noel Polk Lifetime Achievement Award from the Mississippi Institute of Arts and Letters, the Mississippi Governor's Award for Excellence in the Arts/Career in the Arts, and an honorary doctorate from her alma mater, the Mississippi University for Women.

Black resides in the Belhaven Neighborhood of Jackson, Mississippi.

Selected works

References

Living people
People from Sumner, Mississippi
People from Jackson, Mississippi
Mississippi University for Women alumni
Emory University alumni
Local historians
Writers from Mississippi
American non-fiction writers
20th-century American women writers
21st-century American writers
Year of birth missing (living people)
21st-century American women